Fighter Command: The Battle of Britain is a 1983 video game published by Strategic Simulations.

Gameplay
Fighter Command is a game in which aerial combat in the Battle of Britain is simulated.

Reception
Tom Cheche reviewed the game for Computer Gaming World, and stated that "Although FC includes a one day scenario, (Eagle Day), the beauty of the game is most apparent in the campaign scenario, which recreates the crucial period from mid-August to mid-September 1940."

Reviews
Computer and Video Games - Jan, 1986
ACE (Advanced Computer Entertainment) - Dec, 1987

References

External links
Review in Softalk
Review in Family Computing
Review in Compute!'s Gazette
Article in Computer Game Forum
Review in GAMES Magazine
Review in Aktueller Software Markt
Review in CU Amiga

1983 video games
Apple II games
Commodore 64 games
Computer wargames
Strategic Simulations games
Turn-based strategy video games
Video games about Nazi Germany
Video games developed in the United States
Video games set in the United Kingdom
World War II video games